SP Entertainments is an Indian Film production company, started by Venkata Shyam Prasad in 1998.

Films Produced
The company produced several films, such as Swayamvaram, Chirunavvutho, and Kalyana Ramudu.

Company Formation
SP Entertainments formed as a S.P.Entertainments Pvt ltd in the year 2005 with Venkata Shyam Prasad and Venu Thottempudi

Filmography

Awards

References

External links
 SP Entertainments at IMDb.

Film production companies of Andhra Pradesh
Indian companies established in 1998
1998 establishments in Andhra Pradesh